Kanwali is a Municipal Corporation ward in the Dehradun Municipal Corporation of Dehradun district in the state of Uttarakhand, India. This area was under the Kanwali Gram Panchayat before 1998.

List of Councillors

2023 Election

2018 Election

2013 Election

2008 Election

2003 Election

References 

 http://secresult.uk.gov.in/frmDetails2.aspx
 http://www.dehradunbarassociation.com/pastpresidents.html
 http://www.hindustantimes.com/dehradun/political-tussle-mars-dehradun-municipal-body-s-board-proceedings/story-TclSvwC9GxXLMhnaQo7oiK.html
 http://www.tribuneindia.com/news/uttarakhand/politics/7-time-mla-set-for-another-contest/348551.html

External links
 Official Website of the Dehradun Municipal Corporation
 Kanwali Ward Map (2013)
 Kanwali Ward Map (2018)
 Kanwali Ward Voter List (2013)
 Kanwali Ward Voter List (2018)

Dehradun district
Local government in Uttarakhand
Dehradun Municipal Corporation